Martina Caregaro (born 19 May 1992) is an Italian professional tennis player.

Caregaro has won nine singles and nine doubles titles on tournaments of the ITF Circuit. On 22 February 2016, she reached her best singles ranking of world No. 253. On 9 September 2019, she peaked at No. 305 in the WTA doubles rankings.

Playing for the Italy Fed Cup team, Caregaro has a win–loss record of 0–1.

ITF Circuit finals

Singles: 16 (9 titles, 7 runner–ups)

Doubles: 19 (9 titles, 10 runner–ups)

References

External links
 
 
 

1992 births
Living people
Italian female tennis players
21st-century Italian women